The Glover Wilkins Lock (formerly named Lock B) is a lock of the Tennessee-Tombigbee Waterway. It is located close to Smithville, Mississippi.  It was named for Glover Wilkins.

References

Buildings and structures in Monroe County, Mississippi
Tennessee–Tombigbee Waterway